Wilhelm Hohenzollern may refer to:

 Wilhelm I, German Emperor (1797–1888), King of Prussia and the first German Emperor
 Wilhelm II, German Emperor (1859–1941), last German Emperor and King of Prussia
 Wilhelm, German Crown Prince (1882–1951), last German and Prussian Crown Prince
 Wilhelm von Brandenburg (1498–1563), Archbishop of Riga